Robert Frank Krueger is Hathaway Distinguished Professor of Clinical Psychology and Distinguished McKnight University Professor in the Department of Psychology at the University of Minnesota. Robert attended the University of Wisconsin-Madison and completed his clinical internship at Brown University. He is known for his research on personality psychology, clinical psychology, quantitative psychology, developmental psychology, personality disorders, behavioral genetics, and psychopathology. According to Krueger, the goal of his work is to "reduce the burden these problems place on society by working to understand why some people experience psychopathology, while others remain resilient." Krueger primarily studies the comorbidity between personality disorders and anxiety, as well as twins, heritability, personality development, conduct disorder, and antisocial personality disorder. He is the co-editor-in-chief of the Journal of Personality Disorders. He received the American Psychological Association's Award for Distinguished Scientific Early Career Contributions to Psychology in 2005. Krueger helped work on the section III diagnostic criteria of the Personality and Personality Disorders in the DSM-5. He is also one of the highest cited researchers according to the Web of Science.

Publications 
 Krueger, R.F. (1999). The structure of common mental disorders. Archives of General Psychiatry, 56, 921-926.
 Krueger, R. F., Hicks, B. M., Patrick, C. J., Carlson, S. R., Iacono, W. G., & McGue, M. (2002). Etiologic connections among substance dependence, antisocial behavior, and personality: Modeling the externalizing spectrum. Journal of Abnormal Psychology, 111, 411-424.
 Krueger, R. F., & Markon, K. E. (2006). Reinterpreting comorbidity: A model-based approach to understanding and classifying psychopathology. Annual Review of Clinical Psychology, 2, 111-133.
Krueger, R. F., Markon, K. E., Patrick, C. J., Benning, S. D., & Kramer, M. (2007). Linking antisocial behavior, substance use, and personality: An integrative quantitative model of the adult externalizing spectrum. Journal of Abnormal Psychology, 116, 645-666.
Krueger, R. F., & Eaton, N. (2010). Personality traits and the classification of mental disorders: Toward a more complete integration in DSM 5 and an empirical model of psychopathology. Personality Disorders: Theory, Research, and Treatment, 1, 97-118.
Krueger, R. F., Eaton, N. R., Clark, L. A., Watson, D., Markon, K. E., Derringer, J., Skodol, A., & Livesley, W. J. (2011). Deriving an empirical structure of personality pathology for DSM-5. Journal of Personality Disorders, 25, 170-191.
Krueger, R. F., Derringer, J., Irons, D. E., & Iacono, W. G. (2010). Harsh discipline, childhood sexual assault, and MAOA genotype: An investigation of main and interactive effects on diverse clinical externalizing outcomes. Behavior Genetics, 40, 639-648.
Krueger, R. F.,  Eaton, N. R., Keyes, K. M., Balsis, S., Skodol, A. E., Markon, K. W., Grant, B. F., & Hasin, D. S. (2012). An invariant dimensional liability model of gender differences in mental disorder prevalence: Evidence from a national sample. Journal of Abnormal Psychology, 121, 282-288.
 Krueger, R.F., A.G., Hobbs, M.J., Markon, K.E., Eaton, N.R., & Slade, T. (in press). The structure of psychopathology: toward an expanded quantitative empirical model. Journal of Abnormal Psychology.
 Krueger, R.F., Derringer, J., Markon, K.E., Watson, D. (2012). Initial construction of a maladaptive personality trait model and inventory for DSM-5. Psychological Medicine.
 Krueger, R.F., Fowles, D.C., Patrick, C.J, (2009). Triarchic conceptualization of psychopathy: developmental origins of disinhibition, boldness, and meanness. Development and Psychopathology.
 Krueger, R.F., Watson, D., Markon, K.E. (2005). Delineating the Structure of Normal and Abnormal Personality: An Integrative Hierarchical Approach. Journal of Personality and Social Psychology.
 Krueger, R.F., Achenbach., T.M., Watson, D., Kotov, R. (2017). The Hierarchical Taxonomy of Psychopathology (HiTOP): A Dimensional Alternative to Traditional Nosologies. Journal of Abnormal Psychology.
 Krueger, R.F., Fraley, C., Robins, R.W. (2007). Handbook of research methods in personality psychology.
 Krueger, R.F., Benning, S.D., Patrick, C.J., Hicks, B.M., Blonigen, D.M. (2003) Factor structure of the psychopathic personality inventory: validity and implications for clinical assessment. Psychological Assessment.

References

External links
Faculty page

Living people
University of Wisconsin–Madison alumni
Personality psychologists
University of Minnesota faculty
Psychopathologists
Academic journal editors
Year of birth missing (living people)
American clinical psychologists
Behavior geneticists